Reicheiodes is a genus of beetles in the family Carabidae, containing the following species:

 Reicheiodes alpicola (Ganglbauer, 1891)
 Reicheiodes assmanni Balkenohl, 1999
 Reicheiodes concameratus Balkenohl & Joa. Schmidt, 2015
 Reicheiodes convexipennis (Balkenohl, 1994)
 Reicheiodes dewaillyi (Kult, 1949)
 Reicheiodes ellipsoideus Balkenohl, 1995
 Reicheiodes fontanae (Bari, 1950)
 Reicheiodes franzi Dostal, 1993
 Reicheiodes igai (Nakane & S. I. Ueno, 1953)
 Reicheiodes jaegeri Balkenohl & Joa. Schmidt, 1997
 Reicheiodes kodoriensis Fedorenko, 1996
 Reicheiodes kulzeri Bulirsch & Fedorenko, 2007
 Reicheiodes lederi (Reitter, 1888)
 Reicheiodes loebli (Balkenohl, 1994)
 Reicheiodes matokai Sei. Morita, 2015
 Reicheiodes meybohmi Balkenohl, 2003
 Reicheiodes microphthalmus (Heyden, 1870)
 Reicheiodes nishii Sei. Morita & Bulirsch, 2010
 Reicheiodes rotundipennis (Chaudoir, 1843)
 Reicheiodes schatzmayri (Bari, 1950)
 Reicheiodes similitudis Balkenohl & Joa. Schmidt, 2015
 Reicheiodes subcirculatus Balkenohl & Joa. Schmidt, 2016
 Reicheiodes taiwanensis Bulirsch, 2018
 Reicheiodes variobasalis Balkenohl & Joa. Schmidt, 2015
 Reicheiodes yanoi (Kult, 1949)
 Reicheiodes yokozekii Sei. Morita, 2015
 Reicheiodes zvarici (Bulirsch, 1990)

References

Scaritinae